Headsparks is the debut studio album by the American indie rock band Seam, released on March 11, 1992 by Homestead Records.

Recording and release
Headsparks was recorded by Jerry Kee at Duck-Kee Studios in Raleigh, North Carolina in August 1991. The album was released on March 11, 1992 by Homestead Records.

Critical reception
Headsparks was positively received by critics. Ned Raggett of AllMusic awarded the album a rating of four out of five stars and praised Sooyoung Park's singing and guitar playing, saying that the record features "a blend that's at once powerful, heartfelt, and anthemic almost in spite of itself." He considered "Sky City" and "Feather" to be the album's highlights. Victoria Wheeler of Spin also enjoyed the album, commenting that Seam "gets slow but not lethargic, sensitive but not whiny, persistent but not nagging, confused but far from lost. Plus, the band pulls clever punches like pasting all that static-y haze over smartly tart, twangy, almost banjoish guitar."

Track listing

Personnel 
Credits are adapted from the album's liner notes.

Seam
Mac McCaughan – drums
Lexi Mitchell – bass
Sooyoung Park – vocals, guitar

Technical and additional personnel
Jerry Kee – engineering
Sarah Shannon – vocals on "Shame"
Jennifer Walker – vocals on "New Year's"

References

External links
 

1992 debut albums
Homestead Records albums
Seam (band) albums